A referendum on joining the European Economic Community was held in Denmark on 2 October 1972. The result was 63.3% in favour with a turnout of 90.1%. The law that Denmark should be member of the EEC was passed on 11 October 1972, and Denmark became a member on 1 January 1973.

Background
According to Article 20, section 2 of the Danish constitution, any law that makes limitations to the sovereignty of the Danish state (as membership of the EEC would) must be passed in the Danish parliament with 5/6 of the parliament's members voting for the law. If a majority of members vote for the law, but not by 5/6 majority, and the government wishes to uphold the suggested law, the law can still be passed in a public referendum, as was the case in the 1972 referendum.

According to a 2022 study, municipalities that experienced more German-inflicted violence during the German occupation of Denmark in WWII were more likely to vote against joining the EEC.

Results

References

Referendums related to European Union accession
Referendums in Denmark
Denmark
European Communities membership referendum
1972 in international relations
1972 in the European Economic Community
Denmark and the European Union
October 1972 events in Europe